Rebecca Cheptegei (born 22 February 1991) is a female Ugandan long distance and marathon athlete. Rebecca Cheptegei is set to represent Uganda in the 2024 Summer Olympics in Paris in the women's marathon.

Background 
Rebecca Cheptegei is a Uganda and was born on 22 February 1991.

Sporting career 
Rebecca Cheptegei is an athelete with athlete code 14413309. Cheptegei has been racing since 2010 to present and is set to participate in the 2024 Summer Olympics in Paris.

Rebecca Cheptegei in 2010 
She finished 15th in the U20 race in the 38th IAAF World Cross Country Championships, Myslecinek Park, Bydgoszcz. Cheptegei in May won the 1500m race in München Pfingstmeeting, München, Germany before going on to finish 9th in the 800m race at Rehlingen Pfingstsportfest, Rehlingen 2 days later. She would also participate in the Regensburg Sparkassen-Gala, Regensburg in the 1500m race where she finished 15th. Cheptegei also participated in the Janusz Kusociński Memorial, Warszawa 1500m race finishing 10th. She would finish the year off winning the Kampala 10 km race in Kampala, Uganda.

Rebecca Cheptegei in 2011 
She started the year off finishing 55th in the senior race final at the 39th IAAF World Cross Country Championships, Punta Umbria. Cheptegei came 2nd at the Madrid Half Marathon in Madrid. She would later finish 3rd in the Camargo Spanish 10 km Road Running Championships, Camargo. Rebecca then participated in the Rio de Janeiro CISM Military World Games, Rio de Janeiro representing the Uganda People's Defense Forces where she finished 3rd in the 1500m race. Rebecca Cheptegei would also finish 5th in the 1500m at the Kampala Ugandan Championships, Kampala. She would 2nd in the Cantalejo Half Marathon, Cantalejo before finishing off 10th at the 10 km race at the Lisboa Sao Silvestre da Amadora, Lisboa

Rebecca Cheptegei in 2013 
She finished 68th in the senior race at the 40th IAAF World Cross Country Championships, Myslecinek Park, Bydgoszcz. she also won the 47th running of the 'Cross Internacional Ciutat de Granollers'. she would conclude the year winning the 10KM in Crevillente San Silvestre, Crevillente.

Rebecca Cheptegei in 2014 
Rebecca Cheptegei finished 14th in the 5000 meters at the Huelva, Meeting Iberoamericano de Atletismo, Huelva. She would finish 8th in the 3000m race at the Bilbao Reunion Internacional De Atletismo, Bilbao. She went on to win the Santa Pola 10 km, Santa Pola. She would go on to finish 3rd in the Kampala Ugandan Championships, Kampala.

Rebecca Cheptegei in 2016 
She only participated in only one race in 2016 finishing 3rd in the Half Marathon, Quanzhou

Rebecca Cheptegei in 2017 
In her first event in 2017 in the Shanghai Half Marathon, she would finish 12th before finishing 3rd and 2nd in the 5000m and 10000m race at the Kampala Ugandan Championships. She would end the year in 4th place at the Brazzaville Half Marathon.

Rebecca Cheptegei in 2018 
In her only race in 2018, she finished 4th at the Half Marathon in Kampala.

Rebecca Cheptegei in 2019 
She only participated in two races in 2019, finishing 2nd in the Semi Marathon Eiffage de Dakar, Dakar and 5th in the 10000m at the Ugandan Championships, Mandela National Stadium, Kampala.

Rebecca Cheptegei in 2021 
Due to the ovid-19 restrictions, she would return to the truck in 2021 with a 3rd and 5th place finishes in the 4th and 7th UAF Trials, Mandela National Stadium, Kampala respectively. She finished 47th in the Eldoret City Marathon, Eldoret before coming 2nd in the Kampala Half Marathon, Kampala later that year. She also won the inaugural World Mountain and Trail Running Championships in Chiang Mai, Thailand.

Rebecca Cheptegei in 2022 
Rebecca Cheptegei won the Padova Marathon and was 2nd in the 10000m at the Ugandan Championships, Mandela National Stadium, Kampala. She would end the year with a 4th pale finish in the ADNOC Abu Dhabi Marathon. This has earned a place to represent Uganda in the 2024 Summer Olympics in Paris.

See also 
 Uganda at the 2024 Summer Olympics
 Athletics at the 2024 Summer Olympics – Qualification
 List of Ugandan records in athletics
 2021 World Mountain and Trail Running Championships
 Track and field at the 2011 Military World Games – Women's 5000 metres
 2010 IAAF World Cross Country Championships
 2014 African Cross Country Championships

References 

Living people
1991 births